AAVC may refer to:

 American Association of Veterinary Clinicians, USA
 Apacheta-Aguilucho volcanic complex, Chile
 Assault Amphibious Vehicle Command, variant of the military AAV, see Assault Amphibious Vehicle#Variants
 Australian Army Veterinary Corps, military unit, Australia